Hanne Refsholt (born  in Larvik) is a Norwegian agronomist and businessperson. She is CEO of TINE and chair of Domstein.

Career
Refsholt is educated with a Master in Agronomy from the Norwegian College of Agriculture and a Master in Business Administration from the Norwegian School of Management. She started working in research and development for TINE in 1988, and later became director of product development. From 1996-98 she was Director of the Norwegian Independent Meat and Poultry Association, but returned to TINE in 1998. She became an executive officer in 2001 and CEO in 2005. In 2007, the newspaper Nationen declared her the most powerful women in the Norwegian agricultural sector. She is also a board member of the Grocery Manufacturers of Norway.

References

1960 births
Living people
21st-century Norwegian businesswomen
21st-century Norwegian businesspeople
Norwegian College of Agriculture alumni
BI Norwegian Business School alumni
People from Larvik